Stany Delayre (born 26 October 1987 in Bergerac) is a French rower. At the 2012 Summer Olympics, he competed with Jérémie Azou in the men's lightweight double sculls, finishing in 4th place.  On home water, he and Azou won the 2015 World Championship in that event.  Their team also won the silver medal at the 2014 World Championships, and won the 2013, 2014 and 2015 European Championships.  In 2009, Delayre was part of the French men's lightweight quadruple sculls time at the World Championships.  He was also part of the French under-23s men's lightweight quadruple sculls at the 2006 and 2007 Junior World Rowing Championships.

Delayre was not picked for the French team at the 2016 Olympics, after he was beaten by the younger rower Pierre Houin in the individual sculls at the French national trials.

References

External links

1987 births
Living people
French male rowers
People from Bergerac, Dordogne
Rowers at the 2012 Summer Olympics
Olympic rowers of France
World Rowing Championships medalists for France
Sportspeople from Dordogne
European Rowing Championships medalists
21st-century French people